Arthur Ellis (born 7 June 1990) is a rugby union player who plays at open-side flanker for Rosslyn Park. His father played for Wales Schools, Neath and was an Oxford Blue. Ellis attended St Benedict's School, Ealing.

Arthur Ellis played for Wales U16s before representing England at U18, 19 and 20 level. His older brother, Hugo Ellis also represented England U20. Arthur Ellis left London Wasps in June 2010 to join Newport Gwent Dragons. He was released by Newport Gwent Dragons at the end of the 2010–11 season and joined Bridgend Ravens. He has made several appearances for the Ospreys (rugby union) in the Anglo-Welsh Cup and made his first league appearance in the Pro12 against Edinburgh Rugby on 22 February 2013. Ellis also attends and plays rugby for Cardiff University.

References

External links
 Newport Gwent Dragons Past Players

1990 births
Living people
Rugby union players from Aberdare
People educated at St Benedict's School, Ealing
English rugby union players
Dragons RFC players
Ospreys (rugby union) players
Wasps RFC players
Ealing Trailfinders Rugby Club players
Rugby union flankers